Rúhíyyih Rabbání (8 August 1910 – 19 January 2000), born as Mary Sutherland Maxwell and best known by the title Amatu'l-Bahá Rúhíyyih Khánum, was the wife of Shoghi Effendi, the Guardian of the Baháʼí Faith, from 1937 to 1957. In 1952, she was elevated to the office of Hand of the Cause of God, for which she attended to issues related to the expansion and protection of the Baháʼí Faith, and served an important role in the transfer of authority from 1957 to 1963.

Rúhíyyih Rabbání was raised in Montreal, Quebec. After two trips to the Baháʼí holy land in Haifa, Israel, she engaged in many youth activities in the Baháʼí community. She married Shoghi Effendi in 1937. After his death, Rúhíyyih Rabbání became for Baháʼís the last remaining link to the family of ʻAbdu'l-Bahá, who headed the Baháʼí Faith from 1892 to 1921 and was the eldest son of the faith's founder, Baháʼu'lláh. In 2004, CBC viewers voted her number 44 on the list of "greatest Canadians" on the television show The Greatest Canadian.

Rúhíyyih Khánum was the author of several published books, such as Prescription for Living and The Priceless Pearl.

Early life

Rúhíyyih Khánum was born in New York City on August 8, 1910 to William Sutherland Maxwell and May Maxwell, and was raised in Montreal, Quebec where her father was a prominent architect. Through her father, Mary was of Scottish ancestry. The family originated from Aberdeen and Jedburgh. Through her mother, she was primarily of English stock. In 1912, ʻAbdu'l-Bahá visited Canada and stayed in the Maxwells' home. There he met Mary, aged two, and described her as the "essence of sweetness". ʻAbdu'l-Bahá showed much affection to baby Mary.

Her mother wanted to give Mary an education that was free of the rigidity of the traditional educational methods in the country, and established the first Montessori school in Canada at their residence, and Mary attended the school. Maxwell began reading and writing at a young age and her pastimes included writing poetry, novels and plays. She spoke English, French, German and Persian fluently. During her youth, she twice traveled to the Baháʼí World Centre in Palestine for pilgrimage – the first with her mother and the second with her mother's friends, aged fifteen. It was during these pilgrimages that she first met Shoghi Effendi, then head of the Baháʼí Faith.

In her youth, Maxwell was engaged in many Baháʼí activities. At the age of 15, she joined the Executive Committee of the Fellowship of Canadian Youth for Peace. She was also involved in local racial equality conventions, including dances. A spectator, Sadie Oglesby – one of the first African-American Baháʼís  – described her as "sixteen-year-old Mary Maxwell, a beautiful and most refreshing girl to know". By twenty-one, she was elected to the Local Spiritual Assembly of the Baháʼís of Montreal, the local Baháʼí governing council there.

Considered by her contemporaries as attractive and a gifted orator, Mary rapidly established herself as a notable member of the North American Bahá’í community. She made regular trips around the United States and Canada to propagate the religion. From 1932 she began lecturing on The Dawn-Breakers throughout the United States. In May 1933, at the age of 22, she visited Washington, D.C. and insisted all meetings be open to both black and white people. She held talks in Howard University and made an effort to meet African-American’s interested in the Bahá’í Faith. She also attended official functions with her father in Montreal during her twenties, meeting the Governor General of Canada at events such as the Royal Canadian Academy’s Fifty-Fourth Exhibition.

Europe 
As a young woman, Mary had expressed a great desire to learn Spanish. However, her plans to travel to Republican Spain were thwarted with the Spanish Civil War. Instead, Mary chose to live with her cousin in Nazi Germany in 1935, a move which was endorsed by Shoghi Effendi. In Germany, Shoghi Effendi encouraged Mary to strengthen the fledgling Baháʼí community. The young Mary assimilated herself in German culture, wearing a dirndl and learning to speak German fluently.

Whilst in Germany, Mary received an invitation from Shoghi Effendi to go on pilgrimage with her mother. Both mother and daughter accepted the invitation. They were initially planning to travel through the Balkans and visit the Baháʼís, but the unrest of the area forced them to travel directly to Haifa.

Marriage  

Mary had spent long periods of time with Shoghi Effendi prior to marrying, having first met him when she was 12 years of age. She went on pilgrimage again three years later, after which she kept in constant communication with Shoghi Effendi. Arriving in Haifa in January 1937 with her mother, the two began a brief and discreet courtship. In February, the couple were engaged, and Mary cabled her father to come as soon as he could to Haifa. On March 24, at the age of 26, Mary married Shoghi Effendi in a low-key ceremony. It was at this time that Shoghi Effendi entitled her "Amatu'l-Bahá Rúhíyyih Khánum" (Amatu'l-Bahá means "Handmaiden of Glory".) The official marriage announcement was cabled by Shoghi Effendi's mother, Ḍíyáʼíyyih, to the Baháʼí world:Announce Assemblies celebration marriage beloved Guardian. Inestimable honour conferred upon handmaid of Baháʼu'lláh Ruhiyyih Khanum Miss Mary Maxwell. Union of East and West proclaimed by Baháʼí Faith cemented. Ziaiyyih mother of Guardian. As Rúhíyyih was getting used to life in the East, the newlyweds made a trip to Switzerland, and Shoghi Effendi introduced his young bride to his favourite sights in the country. It was initially difficult for her to adjust to her new home and she suffered periods of loneliness and homesickness. With the encouragement of Shoghi Effendi, she studied both the Bible and the Quran and started learning Persian. She later became fluent in the language and was able to deliver talks in Persian. In a letter to her mother a year after her marriage, she wrote that "if anyone asked me what my theme was in life I should say, 'Shoghi Effendi'".

Appointed positions 
Almost immediately after their marriage, she served as the Guardian's secretary, and then in 1941 until 1957 she served as Shoghi Effendi's principal secretary in English. In 1951, she was appointed to the International Baháʼí Council, which was an administrative institution of the Baháʼí Faith created as a precursor to the Universal House of Justice to act as a liaison between the Council and Shoghi Effendi. Later on, on March 26, 1952, she was appointed to the office of Hand of the Cause of God – a distinguished rank in service to the religion – for which she attended to issues related to the propagation and protection of the religion.

After Shoghi Effendi died in 1957, she became for Baháʼís the last remaining link to the family of ʻAbdu'l-Bahá, who headed the Faith from 1892 to 1921 and was the eldest son of the Faith's Founder, Baháʼu'lláh.

Ministry of the Custodians
In 1957, her husband, Shoghi Effendi, died without having appointed a successor. Rúhíyyih Khánum was among the 27 Hands of the Cause who stewarded the religion for the six-year interim, before the Universal House of Justice was scheduled to be elected in 1963. The Hands voted among themselves for nine individuals to work at the Baháʼí World Centre to run the administration of the Faith, a position to which Rúhíyyih Khánum was elected; these nine were designated the Custodians. During this time, she worked on assuring the completion of the ten-year international teaching plan which was launched by Shoghi Effendi in 1953. Upon the election of the Universal House of Justice in 1963, the ending point of Shoghi Effendi's ten-year plan, the nine Hands acting as interim head of the Faith closed their office.

Travels
From 1957 until her death, Rúhíyyih Khánum traveled to over 185 countries and territories working with the world's several million Baháʼís. She especially encouraged members of indigenous peoples to participate in the global Baháʼí community. Her travels took her to all the continents and to small islands. Some of her travels involved extended stays. For four years, she traveled for 58,000 kilometers in a Landrover through sub-Saharan Africa, visiting 34 countries, in 19 of which she was received by the head of state. On another trip, she visited nearly 30 countries in Asia and the Pacific islands during a seven-month span. From January to March 1970, she crossed Africa from east to west, driving 2/3 of the distance herself, visiting many country's communities, meeting with individuals and institutions, both Baháʼí and civic.

In 1975–6, she travelled by boat through the tributaries of the Amazon River of Brazil and visited the high mountain ranges of Peru and Bolivia. Thirty six tribal groups were visited over a period of six months; the trip was called The Green Light Expedition, which followed Khanum's The Great African Safari. There have also been projects developed from the original expedition – In the Footsteps of the Green Light Expedition and Tear of the Clouds.

During her travels, she was received by the following heads of state and government:
 Emperor Haile Selassie of Ethiopia,
 Malietoa Tanumafili II of Western Samoa
 Prime Minister Indira Gandhi of India
 President Félix Houphouët-Boigny of Côte d'Ivoire
 President Carlos Menem of Argentina
 Prime Minister Edward Seaga of Jamaica, and
 Javier Pérez de Cuellar, Secretary-General of the United Nations.

Death
Rúhíyyih Khánum died on January 19, 2000, at the age of 89 in Haifa, Israel. She was buried at the Baháʼí World Centre.

Publications and productions
Rúhíyyih Khánum was also an author; she wrote several books including The Priceless Pearl, which is a biography of Shoghi Effendi; Twenty-Five Years of the Guardianship;, Prescription for Living, which discussed the application of spiritual principles to one's life. and The Desire of the World: Materials for the contemplation of God and His Manifestation for this Day. She was also the editor of the book The Ministry of the Custodians.
She produced two full-length documentary films: The Green Light Expedition and The Pilgrimage.

See also
 Maxwell International Bahai School

Notes

References

Further reading
 Nakhjavani, Violette (1966). Amatu'l-Bahá Visits India. Baha'i Publishing Trust, New Delhi.
 Ruhiyyih Khanum on Bahá'í Library

External links
 Nakhjavani, Violette. A Tribute to Amatu'l-Bahá Rúhíyyih Khánum.

Canadian Bahá'ís
Hands of the Cause
Family of Baháʼu'lláh
American emigrants to Canada
Canadian people of Scottish descent
Religious leaders from New York City
People from Montreal
1910 births
2000 deaths
20th-century Bahá'ís